Rebirth may refer to:

Arts, entertainment, and media

Film
 Rebirth (2011 film), a 2011 Japanese drama film
 Rebirth (2016 film), a 2016 American thriller film
 Rebirth, a documentary film produced by Project Rebirth
 The Rebirth (film), a 2007 Japanese film directed by Masahiro Kobayashi
 Mortal Kombat: Rebirth, a 2010 short film

Music

Bands and groups
 Rebirth Brass Band, a New Orleans brass band
 The Rebirth (band), a Los Angeles soul band
 Rebirth, a record label which The March Violets have recorded under

Albums and EPs
 Rebirth (Aka Moon album), 1994
 Rebirth (Angra album), 2001
 Rebirth (Billy Childs album), 2017
 Rebirth (Gackt album), 2001
 Rebirth (Jennifer Lopez album), 2005
 Rebirth (Jimmy Cliff album), 2012
 Rebirth (Keith Sweat album), 2002
 Rebirth (Lil Wayne album), 2010
 Rebirth (Masami Okui album), 2004
 Rebirth (Pain album), 1999
 ReBirth (album), a 2020 album by Young Stunners
 The Rebirth, a 2009 album by Bobby V
 The Rebirth (Eric Bellinger album), 2014
 Rebirth (EP), a 2009 EP by SS501
 R.ebirth, a 2016 mixtape by Ravi

Songs
 "Rebirth", a song by Bone Thugs-n-Harmony on the album Uni5: The World's Enemy, 2010
 "Rebirth", a song by Born of Osiris on the album A Higher Place, 2009
 "Rebirth", a song by Erra on the album Augment, 2013
 "Rebirth", a song by Gorgoroth on the album Quantos Possunt ad Satanitatem Trahunt, 2009
 "Rebirth", a 2011 song by Ran-D

Publications
 Rebirth (manhwa), a manhwa series by Lee Kang-woo
 Rebirth (newspaper), a short-lived hippie underground newspaper in Phoenix, Arizona
 DC Rebirth, a 2016 relaunch of DC Comics monthly ongoing series
 Green Lantern: Rebirth, a comic book series
 The Flash: Rebirth, a comic book series
 The Chrysalids, titled in the United States as Re-Birth, a 1955 novel by John Wyndham

Television
 "Rebirth" (Batman Beyond), 1999 television episodes
 "Rebirth" (Batwoman), a 2021 television episode
 "Rebirth" (Death Note), a 2006 television episode
 "Rebirth" (Futurama), a 2010 television episode
 "Rebirth" (Supergirl), a 2021 television episode
 "Rebirth" (The 4400), a 2005 television episode
 "Rebirth" (The Legend of Korra), a 2014 television episode
 The Transformers: The Rebirth, a television season
 Rebirth, an anime television series by Liden Films

Video games
 .hack//G.U. Volume 1: Rebirth, a 2006 video game
 Tales of Rebirth, a 2004 video game
 ReBirth, a title appended to video game titles to indicate a sequel or remake, such as:
 Gradius ReBirth, a 2008 shoot 'em up video game
 Castlevania: The Adventure ReBirth, a side-scrolling action platform game developed by M2
 Contra ReBirth, a 2009 2D run and gun video game
 Hyperdimension Neptunia Re;Birth 1
 The Binding of Isaac: Rebirth, an independent roguelike video game

Religion
 Regeneration (theology), a concept in Christian theology
 Born again, a Christian term referring to a spiritually reborn person
 Reincarnation, the transmigration of a deceased person's spirit/soul, essence and consciousness into another body and other name
 Rebirth (Buddhism)
 Resurrection, the concept of coming back to life after death
 Universal resurrection, a term referring to an event by which people are resurrected

Other uses
 Rebirth (breathwork), a type of breathwork invented by Leonard Orr
 Rebirth (sculpture), a proposed outdoor sculpture by American artist Seyed Alavi
 ReBirth RB-338, a software synthesizer

See also
 Born Again (disambiguation)
 New Birth (disambiguation)
 Past life (disambiguation)
 Past Lives (disambiguation)
 Rebirthing (disambiguation)
 Reborn (disambiguation)
 Reincarnation (disambiguation)
 Renaissance, the cultural phenomenon which literally translates as "rebirth" in French